Stephen Surjik (born 1960) is a Canadian film and television director, and producer.

He is known for his work on the film Wayne's World 2, the Marvel TV series Daredevil and  The Punisher, the Netflix series The Umbrella Academy and The Witcher.

He was nominated three times for Gemini Awards for best direction, for Little Criminals, Tripping the Wire: A Stephen Tree Mystery and Intelligence, and received four Emmy Award nominations for Weapons of Mass Distraction.

Career

Born in Regina, Saskatchewan in 1960, he studied at the Concordia University in Montreal and received a Best Director award at the 14th Canadian Student Film & Video Festival in 1982 for Second Story Man.

After working as production designer and art director in the mid-80s, he moved on, directing for the series The Kids in the Hall. In 1993 Surjik made his feature film debut with Wayne's World 2, starring fellow Canadian Mike Myers.

For television, he has directed films such as the 1996 Grand Prix "Cinéma Tout Ecran" award-winning Little Criminals, the Emmy-nominated Weapons of Mass Distraction, starring Ben Kingsley and Gabriel Byrne, and the CBC movie Intelligence. His episodic credits include Da Vinci's Inquest, Legacy, The Handler, Road to Avonlea, Due South, X-Files, Warehouse 13 and pilots for Bull, Miss Miami and Zoe Busiek: Wildcard and Intelligence. His more recent television work includes; Common Law, Burn Notice, Graceland, Person of Interest, Arrow and The Flash.

Radio show
In 2018 Surjik launched his own radio show and podcast on Brigade-Radio-One called Field Report. The show is produced by Ethan Dettenmaier and centers on his current projects.

Filmography

As director

As producer

As actor

Notes

External links
 
 
 Official Site including Trailer
 Candy Fiveways MySpace page
 Sky Movies including video diary
 Video of Surjik directing an episode of "Intelligence"
 Surjik's radio show

Canadian art directors
Film directors from Saskatchewan
Canadian production designers
Canadian television directors
Concordia University alumni
Living people
People from Regina, Saskatchewan
Canadian Film Centre alumni
1960 births